Charles Montague Williams (22 May 1800 – 17 March 1830) was an English first-class cricketer who played for the Marylebone Cricket Club in one match in 1823, totalling 0 runs with a highest score of 0 and holding 2 catches.

References

Bibliography
 

English cricketers
English cricketers of 1787 to 1825
Marylebone Cricket Club cricketers
1800 births
1830 deaths